dsw was a Unix command which enabled deletion of files with non-typeable characters.  It was replaced by the same functionality implemented in rm, namely  rm -i.

See also
 rm

References

External links
 Version 1 man page
 The Truth About Unix....

File deletion
Standard Unix programs